The Church of St Mary in Bridgwater, Somerset, England was built in the 13th century, and has been designated as a Grade I listed building. It is dedicated to Saint Mary, the Virgin. The first vicar was recorded c1170

The building is on the site of an earlier church which was rebuilt by William Briwere in the early 13th century.

St Mary's church has a north porch and windows dating from the 14th century. During the 15th and 16th centuries chapels were added, modifying the nave and the chancel extended.

In July 1685, during the Monmouth Rebellion, the Duke of Monmouth watched from the tower as the forces of King James II assembled, at Westonzoyland, under the command of the Earl of Feversham prior to the Battle of Sedgemoor. The spire was split by lightning in 1814 and repaired the following year. On the face of the tower is a clock installed in 1869 replacing earlier clocks which had been on the tower since 1393. Within the tower were originally eight bells. The oldest bell dated from 1617 with further bells being added through the 17th and 18th centuries, with the Tenor being added in 1868 and cast by John Taylor & Co. An additional five bells were added to the peal in 2020.

Between 1849 and 1851 major renovation work, by Dickson and Brakspear of Manchester, included the removal of the galleries and box pews; they were replaced by regular pews. Between 1877 and 1878 further alterations were made, and in 1888 the walled up arch between the nave and the tower was opened. In 1902 a vestry was added. In 1937 more alterations were made and the decoration of the Sanctuary simplified.

It was apparently captured when a Spanish warship was taken a prize. The artist is unknown, although it has been controversially attributed to Murillo or Annibale Carracci. The picture is now used as the altarpiece of the church. It also possesses an octagonal 16th century oak pulpit.

The parish is part of the benefice of Bridgwater St Mary and Chilton Trinity which is within the deanery of Sedgemoor.

The Church was closed on 6 June 2016 to allow extensive renovation to be carried out, and reopened in February 2017. The work involved replacing most of the pews by chairs, replacing the floor, and modernising the heating and lighting, as well as upgrading the catering facilities. Four blocks of the pews with about 80 seats were retained, mounted on low plinths and made mobile, allowing full flexibility in the use of the building.

See also

 Grade I listed buildings in Sedgemoor
 List of Somerset towers
 List of ecclesiastical parishes in the Diocese of Bath and Wells

References

13th-century church buildings in England
Church of England church buildings in Sedgemoor
Grade I listed churches in Somerset
Saint Mary
Grade I listed buildings in Sedgemoor
Monmouth Rebellion